Ryan Amador (born ) is an American singer-songwriter and LGBT rights advocate.

Early life and education 
Amador began recording demos of original songs in Hollywood at the age of 12. He acted in musicals while in school. He graduated from New York University in 2011 with a degree in drama.

Career 
Amador released his first EP Symptoms of a Wide Eyed Being which was produced by Justin Goldner and Shaina Taub. He went on tour though Chicago in 2012. He later released a second EP Palos Verdes: A Teenage Retrospective. Amador is a recurring guest on the radio channel, OutQ and has performed at pride events in New York, Cleveland, and Pittsburgh where he opened for Adam Lambert. He released his debut album Ryan Amador in June 2013. It went on Spotify in September 2013. The lead single of the album is "Define Me" featuring Jo Lampert. The music video includes Lampert and Amador taking off their clothes to reveal anti-gay slurs written on their bodies. The music video was directed by Tom Gustafson. The song was written for a youth LGBT conference. Amador released the single and music view "Instead," a piano ballad about desire for a former lover. In 2015, he released a single "Spectrum" featuring Lampert and Gyasi Ross. It is about the spectrum of sexual identities and includes a music video. In 2016, Amador released "Light Me Up" featuring Daniel Weidlein. The song is a queer version of Hollywood gangster film. The music video was directed by Mark Solomon. In 2018, Amador released the LGBT themed single, "Loverboy." The song was inspired by the film, Call Me by Your Name and features a 1980s-influenced synthesized beat. A music video was released starring director Jesse Scott Egan. "Loverboy" is the second single for the album The American. Proceeds from the song will be donated to Basic Rights Oregon.

Amador and Celeste Lecesne are the co-founders of The Future Perfect Project, a program to for LGBTQ high school students to share stories and express themselves in performances, musical compositions, and original writing.

Artistry 
Amador is inspired by progressive artists including Gotye and Janelle Monáe. His music is influenced by Damien Rice, Jason Mraz, and John Legend.

Personal life 
Amador is based in Los Angeles and Brooklyn. He is gay. He has been in a relationship with pianist and composer Henry Koperski since July 2018.

Discography

Albums 

 Ryan Amador 2013
The American 2019

Extended plays 

 Symptoms of a Wide Eyed Being
 Palos Verdes: A Teenage Retrospective

Singles 

 "Define Me" 2013
"Instead" 2013
"Spectrum" 2015
"Light Me Up" 2016

"Loverboy" 2018

References

External links
 

Living people
20th-century births
21st-century American male writers
American male singer-songwriters
Singers from Los Angeles
American gay musicians
American LGBT singers
Gay singers
Gay songwriters
American LGBT songwriters
New York University alumni
Writers from Los Angeles
21st-century American male singers
American LGBT rights activists
Year of birth missing (living people)
20th-century American LGBT people
21st-century American LGBT people
Singer-songwriters from California
American gay writers